The Ship of Monsters is a 1960 Mexican comic science fiction film. It was produced by Jesús Sotomayor Martínez,  directed by Rogelio A. González, and starred Eulalio González, Ana Bertha Lepe and Lorena Velázquez. The screenplay, by Alfredo Varela, Jr., was based on a story by José María Fernández Unsáin.

Plot
Two Venusian women, Gamma (Lepe) and Beta (Velázquez), are sent on a mission by their queen (Consuelo Frank) to search for males to repopulate the planet. Along the way, they and their servant, Tor the robot, acquire a colorful array of male extraterrestrial creatures in their "ship of monsters", including Martian prince Tagual, Uk the cyclops, Utirr the spider and skeletal Zok. Landing in Mexico, Gamma and Beta become enamored with singing cowboy Lauriano (Eulalio González).

Cast
 Eulalio González as Lauriano Treviño Gómez
 Ana Bertha Lepe as Gamma
 Lorena Velázquez as Beta
 Consuelo Frank as Regente de Venus
 Manuel Alvarado as Ruperto
 Heberto Dávila, Jr. as Chuy Treviño Gómez
 Mario García "Harapos" as Borracho 
 José Pardavé as Atenógenes
 Jesús Rodríguez Cárdenas

Reception
Filmstruck critic Jeff Stafford called it "one of the more exotic genre hybrids that emerged from Mexico in the early sixties, mixing sci-fi, horror and Western elements into something uniquely original".

Beth Accomando of KPBS praised the film, saying, "You'll find deliciously low budget sets Ed Wood would die for; a know-it-all robot; babes in bathing suit space uniforms; and a refreshing Mexican take on American sci-fi conventions".

References

External links
 

1960 films
1960s science fiction comedy films
Mexican science fiction comedy films
Films directed by Rogelio A. González
1960s Spanish-language films
Venus in film
1960 comedy films
1960s Mexican films